James Thomas Johnston (January 19, 1839 – July 19, 1904) was an American lawyer,  Civil War veteran, and politician who served two terms as a U.S. Representative from Indiana from 1885 to 1889.

Biography
Born near Greencastle, Indiana, Johnston attended the common schools.
He studied law.
During the Civil War he enlisted as a private in Company C, Sixth Indiana Cavalry, in July 1862.
He transferred to Company A, Eighth Tennessee Cavalry, in September 1863 and was commissioned as a second lieutenant, serving until January 1864, when he resigned.
Afterwards he served as a commissary sergeant of the One Hundred and Thirty-third Regiment, Indiana Volunteer Infantry.
Commissioned as a lieutenant and assistant quartermaster of the One Hundred and Forty-ninth Regiment, Indiana Volunteer Infantry, he was mustered out in September 1865.

He was admitted to the bar in March 1866 and commenced practice in Rockville, Indiana.
He served as prosecuting attorney 1866-1868.
He served as member of the State house of representatives in 1868.
He served in the State senate 1874-1878.

Congress 
Johnston was elected as a Republican to the Forty-ninth and Fiftieth Congresses (March 4, 1885 – March 3, 1889).
He was an unsuccessful candidate for reelection.

Later career and death 
He resumed the practice of law.
He was the Commander of the Grand Army of the Republic, Department of Indiana, in 1893.

He died in Rockville, Indiana, July 19, 1904 and was interred in the Rockville Cemetery.

References
 Retrieved on 2009-5-12

1839 births
1904 deaths
People of Indiana in the American Civil War
Union Army officers
People from Putnam County, Indiana
People from Rockville, Indiana
19th-century American politicians
Burials in Indiana
Republican Party members of the United States House of Representatives from Indiana